James Charles Dowdall (18 February 1873 – 28 June 1939) was an Irish politician and businessman.

Born in Chatham, England, Dowdall was a founder member and President of the Cork Industrial Development Association and was a butter and margarine manufacturer. He was also a Director of the Lucania Cycle Company, the Cork Gas Company and Hibernian Insurance Company. He was appointed to the Free State Seanad Éireann as an independent member in December 1922 by the President of the Executive Council, W. T. Cosgrave. He was one of a number of Senators with commercial backgrounds nominated by Cosgrave.

In the 1928 Seanad election six Fianna Fáil Senators were elected under the leadership of Joseph Connolly. They were immediately joined by Colonel Maurice George Moore and subsequently Dowdall found himself frequently joining with the party in divisions together with fellow independent Senator Jennie Wyse Power. He soon joined the party after their entry into the Seanad. Both he and Wyse Power stood as Fianna Fáil candidates in the 1934 Seanad election and were re-elected for nine years and served until the abolition of the Seanad.

Dowdall was also a member of the Governing Body of University College Cork. He died on 28 June 1939 and is buried in St. Finbarr's Cemetery.

He was married to Jane Dowdall. His brother was Thomas Dowdall.

References

1873 births
1939 deaths
Independent members of Seanad Éireann
Members of the 1922 Seanad
Members of the 1925 Seanad
Members of the 1928 Seanad
Members of the 1931 Seanad
Members of the 1934 Seanad
Fianna Fáil senators
Politicians from County Cork